Applied category theory is an academic discipline in which methods from category theory are used to study other fields including but not limited to computer science, physics (in particular quantum mechanics), natural language processing, control theory, probability theory and causality. The application of category theory in these domains can take different forms. In some cases the formalization of the domain into the language of category theory is the goal, the idea here being that this would elucidate the important structure and properties of the domain. In other cases the formalization is used to leverage the power of abstraction in order to prove new results about the field.

List of applied category theorists 

 Samson Abramsky
 John C. Baez
 Bob Coecke 
 Joachim Lambek
 Valeria de Paiva
 Gordon Plotkin
 Dana Scott
 David Spivak

See also 

 Categorical quantum mechanics
 ZX-calculus
 DisCoCat
 Petri net
 Univalent foundations
 String diagrams

External links 
Journals:

 Compositionality

Conferences:

 Applied category theory
 Symposium on Compositional Structures (SYCO)

Books:

 Picturing Quantum Processes
 Categories for Quantum Theory
 An Invitation to Applied Category Theory
 Category Theory for the Sciences

Institutes:

 the Quantum Group at the University of Oxford
 TallCat, a research group at Tallinn University of Technology
 Topos Institute
 Cybercat Institute
Software:

 DisCoPy, a Python toolkit for computing with string diagrams
 CatLab.jl, a framework for applied category theory in the Julia language

References 

Category theory